Rinaldo Rafanelli (July 4, 1949 - June 25, 2021) was an Argentine bassist and singer. He also participated as a musician, arranger and producer.

References

1949 births
2021 deaths
People from Villa Mercedes, San Luis
Singers from Buenos Aires
20th-century Argentine male  singers
21st-century Argentine  male singers